Moel Eilio (not to be confused with Moel Eilio near Snowdon), is a  hill in the eastern Carneddau of northern Wales. It looks very prominent on the approach from the north towards Llanrwst along the Conwy Valley.

Mountains and hills of Conwy County Borough
Mountains and hills of Snowdonia
Dolgarrog